Theodore Hack (17 November 1840 – 27 December 1902) was a South Australian politician.

He was born at Echunga, South Australia a son of John Barton Hack and his wife Bridget Hack, née Watson, and was educated at the Adelaide Educational Institution.

Hack was by turns landing officer at Semaphore, harbormaster at Port Willunga, clerk with the Engineer-in-Chief's Department, railway storekeeper, timber merchant (with his sister-in-law Stella Ann Robin after the death of her husband Theophilus Robin), then valuer and architect. He was  member of the Port Adelaide council (and for two years its mayor) and the first mayor of Semaphore, as well as a member of the House of Assembly, representing Gumeracha between 1890 and 1893.

Hack was a judge at the Adelaide Jubilee International Exhibition in 1887, a member of the Central Roads' Board and the Fire Brigades' Board, a lay preacher for the Methodist Church and active with several Methodist organisations. He was president of the Local Teachers' Association, the governing body of Prince Alfred College, chairman and treasurer of the Prisoners' Aid Society and an active member of the Chamber of Manufacturers. He died of Bright's disease, from which he had suffered for some time.

Family
Theodore Hack married Elvira Louisa Ansell (c. 1842 – 7 October 1890) on 17 November 1864. Their children included:
Ernest Barton Hack (13 May 1867 – 27 March 1936) married Isabelle Maddison (c. 1870–1949) of Glenelg some time after 1890. He was a chess enthusiast and architect of Coolgardie, Western Australia, had pyrrhic victory in WA Supreme Court 1898, moved to Kew, Victoria.
Harold Ansell Hack (2 July 1869 – 6 February 1937) married Maud May Southward in Coolgardie, Western Australia on 14 September 1900
Emily Bee Hack (1871–1952) married James Fergusson Ballantyne in 1901, lived in Glenburnie, South Australia.
(Theodore) Bernard Hack (26 February 1873 – ) moved to Tasmania
Stella Ellie Hack (12 January 1875 – 1957) lived in Wayville, South Australia.
Clement Alfred Hack (17 March 1877 – 8 June 1930) was a prominent patent attorney in Victoria.
Wilfred Hack (1879–1879)
Roy Darton Hack (7 February 1882 Adelaide – 1966 Armadale, Vic.) 
They adopted Elsie Miriam Earl (1881–1976), who was known for some time as Elsie Miriam Earl Hack. She was a student at Knightsbridge School and a fine pianist and singer. She married John Arthur Ballantyne (1873–1942) on 7 August 1907, lived in Wayville, South Australia.

Hack married again, to Elizabeth Jane Almers, née Nancarrow (1858–1914) in Adelaide, in 1898.

References

1840 births
1902 deaths
Australian timber merchants
History of Port Adelaide
Mayors of places in South Australia
Members of the South Australian House of Assembly
People educated at Adelaide Educational Institution
Deaths from nephritis
19th-century Australian politicians
19th-century Australian businesspeople
Australian people of English descent